Chemokine (C-X-C motif) ligand 3 (CXCL3) is a small cytokine belonging to the CXC chemokine family that is also known as GRO3 oncogene (GRO3), GRO protein gamma (GROg) and macrophage inflammatory protein-2-beta (MIP2b).  CXCL3 controls migration and adhesion of monocytes and mediates its effects on its target cell by interacting with a cell surface chemokine receptor called CXCR2. More recently, it has been shown that Cxcl3 regulates cell autonomously the migration of the precursors of cerebellar granule neurons toward the internal layers of cerebellum, during the morphogenesis of cerebellum. Moreover, if the expression of Cxcl3 is reduced in cerebellar granule neuron precursors, this highly enhances the frequency of the medulloblastoma, the tumor of cerebellum. In fact, the reduced expression of Cxcl3 forces the cerebellar granule neuron precursors to remain at the surface of the cerebellum, where they highly proliferate under the stimulus of Sonic hedgehog, becoming target of transforming insults. Remarkably, the treatment with CXCL3 completely prevents the growth of medulloblastoma lesions in a Shh-type mouse model of medulloblastoma. Thus, CXCL3 is a target for medulloblastoma therapy. Cxcl3 is directly regulated transcriptionally by BTG2

The gene for CXCL3 is located on chromosome 4 in a cluster of other CXC chemokines.

References

External links
 

Cytokines